"Angela Bassett did the thing" is a quote from a performance made by American actress Ariana DeBose during the ceremony of the 76th British Academy Film Awards on 19 February 2023.

Background 

The British Academy Film Awards are an annual film award show by the British Academy of Film and Television Arts (commonly referred to as BAFTA). American actress Ariana DeBose had previously won the BAFTA Award for Best Actress in a Supporting Role during the 75th British Academy Film Awards ceremony in March 2022 for her role as Anita in the 2021 Steven Spielberg musical West Side Story. She was also nominated for the Rising Star Award.

A large number of female actresses & crew were nominated for the 2023 ceremony, including Angela Bassett for her role in Black Panther: Wakanda Forever, Michelle Yeoh for Everything Everywhere All at Once and Charlotte Wells, director of Aftersun. DeBose opened the ceremony with a performance celebrating women in film, covering "Sisters Are Doin' It for Themselves" (by Eurythmics and Aretha Franklin) and "We Are Family" (by Sister Sledge) before segueing into a rap name-checking multiple female nominees. Lines from the rap included "Angela Bassett did the thing, Viola Davis my Woman King / Blanchett, Cate, you're a genius, and Jamie Lee, you are all of us!".

Following the event, DeBose deactivated her Twitter account but continued to react positively to references about the performance. Show producer Nick Bullen said that criticism towards DeBose was "incredibly unfair", going on to say that she opened the show with "some energy [and] some fun".  

"Angela Bassett did the thing" was widely quoted by many as a stand-out quote from the rap. The true meaning of "the thing" is unknown, with BBC News saying the vagueness of the lyric contributed to its success, allowing it to be "endlessly adapted for any person and any situation". American singer and rapper Lizzo quoted the line during a performance on the European leg of her Special Tour, as did Adele during her "Weekends with Adele" residency.

Reception 
The reception was mixed, with social media being largely responsible for the virality of the piece. 

Many of those name-checked in the rap praised the performance. Angela Bassett mentioned the piece during an acceptance speech at the 54th NAACP Image Awards on February 25 2023, following her win of the Entertainer of the Year Award, jokingly saying "I guess Angela Bassett did the thing!" Jamie Lee Curtis also defended the piece, saying it was a "joyous, celebratory, sisterly" performance.

Stuart Heritage of The Guardian prefaced a lyric-by-lyric analysis of the performance by calling it "so gormless, so busy [&] so deeply and unsettlingly confusing". Raven Smith of Vogue, however, praised the piece, calling it "hypnotic".

References 

Internet culture
Social media
Hashtags
2023 in Internet culture
2023 neologisms